Aradhya Malhotra is the co-founder of Skyless Game Studios, an educational and training oriented video games firm with a focus on social impact. He founded Skyless Game Studios alongside Chris Bennett and Oleks Levtchenko in 2012.

Malhotra has also been featured as a Forbes 30-under-30 entrepreneur for the year 2016. In the 30-under-30 feature, Forbes covered the immigration issues that Malhotra faced when his US visa expired. Malhotra wrote in the feature that during his initial days of entrepreneurship, he had to teach himself "to stop thinking negatively" and to rather "focus on the solution."

References

Living people
Indian company founders
Year of birth missing (living people)